Ruby Airport  is a state-owned public-use airport located one nautical mile (1.85 km) southeast of the central business district of Ruby, a city in the Yukon-Koyukuk Census Area of the U.S. state of Alaska.

As per Federal Aviation Administration records, the airport had 1,915 passenger boardings (enplanements) in calendar year 2008, 1,634 enplanements in 2009, and 1,809 in 2010. It is included in the National Plan of Integrated Airport Systems for 2011–2015, which categorized it as a general aviation airport (the commercial service category requires at least 2,500 enplanements per year).

Facilities 
Ruby Airport has one runway designated 3/21 with a gravel surface measuring 4,000 by 100 feet (1,219 x 30 m).

Airlines and destinations 

Wright Air Service offers scheduled passenger service at this airport:

References

External links 
 Topographic map from USGS The National Map
 FAA Alaska airport diagram (GIF)
 

Airports in the Yukon–Koyukuk Census Area, Alaska